The Glasgow School is a compilation album by the Scottish band Orange Juice, released in 2005. It contains the band's four singles for Postcard Records, the greater part of the 1992 compilation album Ostrich Churchyard (which contains early versions of tracks that later appeared on the 1982 album You Can't Hide Your Love Forever), an alternate version of "Simply Thrilled Honey", and a cover of "I Don't Care" by the Ramones. This material was all recorded between 1978 and 1981, prior to the band signing with Polydor Records.

Track listing
All tracks were composed by Edwyn Collins; except where indicated
"Falling and Laughing" – 4:00
"Moscow" (James Kirk) – 2:01
"Moscow Olympics" (James Kirk) – 2:07
"Blue Boy" – 2:53
"Love Sick" – 2:27
"Simply Thrilled Honey" – 2:43
"Breakfast Time" – 1:56
"Poor Old Soul (Part 1)" – 2:29
"Poor Old Soul (Part 2)" – 2:36
"Louise Louise" – 2:50
"Three Cheers For Our Side" (James Kirk) – 2:52
"In A Nutshell" – 4:06
"Satellite City" – 2:42
"Consolation Prize" – 3:10
"Holiday Hymn" (Vic Goddard) – 3:00
"Intuition Told Me (Part 1)" – 1:13
"Intuition Told Me (Part 2)" – 3:22
"Wan Light" (James Kirk) – 2:30
"Dying Day" – 3:09
"Texas Fever" – 1:44
"Tender Object" – 4:40
"Blokes on 45" (James Kirk) – 4:13
"I Don't Care" (Douglas Colvin, Jeffrey Hyman, John Cummings, Tom Erdelyi) – 3:08

Personnel
Orange Juice
Edwyn Collins
James Kirk
David McClymont
Steven Daly

References

Orange Juice (band) albums
2005 compilation albums
Domino Recording Company compilation albums